"Watch the World Burn" is a song by American rock band Falling in Reverse. It was released on January 31, 2023, through Epitaph Records. The song was released as the third single from the band's upcoming EP Neon Zombie.

Promotion and release
In early January 2023, vocalist Ronnie Radke changed his social media profile photo to a photo of planet Earth on fire. The band finally released the single on January 31, 2023, thus being the third single from their upcoming EP Neon Zombie. That same day the band had a presentation on their "ROCKZILLA" tour with Papa Roach, the band presented the song live for the first time. The single cover was also revealed, it is similar to the cover of single "Popular Monster", however this cover shows Ronnie Radke in gray tone with a crown of thorns simulating the crucifixion of Jesus Christ.

Composition and lyric
The song has balanced metalcore with rap and hip hop with clear influences from Tech N9ne in rap. The song was produced by frontman Ronnie Radke and metalcore band DangerKids vocalist Tyler Smyth. It was also composed by themselves along with Wage War guitarist Cody Quistad and the two Falling in Reverse members Christian Thompson and Tyler Burgess. The song talks about Ronnie Radke again fighting his inner demons, explaining the problems with his haters and people in the music industry who do not respect him. This is based on several people criticizing him after canceling a concert because the band's laptops were stolen, arguing that a rock band doesn't need laptops to play.

Commercial performance
"Watch the World Burn" achieved immediate success shortly after its release, the song managed to position itself on prominent music charts, debuting for the first time at number 95 on the UK Singles chart, the most important in the United Kingdom. It also managed to debut for the first time on the main Canadian chart at number 77 on Billboard Canadian Hot 100 chart. The single made the band debut for the first time on the Billboard Hot 100 chart, and peaked at number 83. The single gained over 15 million views on YouTube, 161,000 in airplay audience and more than 4,000 digital downloads.

Music video
The music video was released the same day the single was released and was again directed by Jensen Noen. The video shows Ronnie Radke as sort of a superhero but representing more of an anti-hero in a post-modern world, as a reference to Homelander from The Boys series and Injustice: Gods Among Us. The video also shows a reference to General Hux's speech in Star Wars: The Force Awakens. Finally, there is a scene featuring a parody of ex-Skid Row vocalist Sebastian Bach who has several laptops raining down on him from above. This is a reference to the dispute Bach had with vocalist Ronnie Radke on Twitter regarding Falling In Reverse being forced to cancel a show because some of their laptops were stolen. The video reached 1 million views on the first day on YouTube and reached #1 in global trends.

Charts

References

2023 singles
2023 songs
Falling in Reverse songs
Songs written by Ronnie Radke
Epitaph Records singles